The 2014 San Jose State Spartans football team represented San Jose State University in the 2014 NCAA Division I FBS football season. The Spartans were led by second-year head coach Ron Caragher and played their home games at Spartan Stadium. They were members of the Mountain West Conference in the West Division. They finished the season 3–9, 2–6 in Mountain West play to finish in fifth place in the West Division.

Personnel
Ron Caragher returned for his second season as San Jose State head coach. New at defensive coordinator was Greg Robinson, a longtime coach who previously served as defensive coordinator at the University of Texas at Austin in 2013. Robinson's career also included a stint as defensive coordinator for the NFL's Denver Broncos from 1995 to 2000, including the Broncos' Super Bowl-winning seasons in 1997 and 1998.

Roster

Schedule

Schedule Source:

Game summaries

North Dakota

at No. 5 Auburn

at Minnesota

Nevada

UNLV

at Wyoming

at Navy

Colorado State

at Fresno State

Hawaii

at Utah State

at San Diego State

References

San Jose State
San Jose State Spartans football seasons
San Jose State Spartans football